Darren Dimitri Mattocks (born 2 September 1990) is a Jamaican professional footballer who last played as a forward for Phoenix Rising FC and the Jamaica national football team.

College career
Mattocks played for the University of Akron where he made 47 appearances and scored 39 goals over two years. He was nominated for several awards during his tenure, including one to the first-year All-American teams by several different media outlets.

Professional career

Vancouver Whitecaps FC
Mattocks was selected by Vancouver Whitecaps FC with the second overall pick in the 2012 MLS SuperDraft.

He made his club debut on opening day against the Montreal Impact coming off the bench. Soon after his club debut he suffered severe burns from a cooking accident and missed almost two months before returning to the line-up on 9 May against FC Edmonton when he scored his first goal for the Whitecaps in the 93rd minute.

Mattocks scored his first MLS goal on 26 May 2012 against the Portland Timbers. Mattocks scored six goals in his first nine MLS appearances in 2012. In the Whitecaps' first ever playoff game versus the LA Galaxy, Mattocks scored the first ever playoff goal for the Vancouver Whitecaps in the fourth minute of play. He earned the team's Golden Boot award that year with seven goals.

Portland Timbers
Mattocks was traded in March 2016 to Portland Timbers in exchange for targeted allocation money and general allocation money.

D.C. United
On 10 December 2017, Mattocks, after having his contract option rejected by Portland, was traded to D.C. United in exchange for an international roster slot. D.C. United exercised Mattocks' option for 2018, but he lost his starting role after Wayne Rooney arrived in the mid-summer as a Designated Player.

On 11 March 2018, Mattocks scored his first MLS regular season goal for D.C. United. He scored the only goal for D.C. United in the 3–1 loss against Atlanta United. In his time with DC United, he appeared in 25 games and scored 10 goals.

FC Cincinnati
In December 2018, Mattocks was drafted by FC Cincinnati in the 2018 MLS Expansion Draft.

Al-Merrikh
After nearly a year without a club, Mattocks joined Sudan Premier League side Al-Merrikh in February 2021, ahead of their CAF Champions League campaign.

Phoenix Rising FC
Mattocks signed with Phoenix Rising FC of the USL Championship on August 18, 2021.

International career
Mattocks made his international debut for Jamaica in 2012, coming on in the 55th minute in a 2–0 win over El Salvador.
He scored three times during the 2014 Caribbean Cup, making him the tournament's joint top scorer, as Jamaica won the tournament for the sixth time.

In 2015, Mattocks was included in Jamaica's squads for the Copa América and CONCACAF Gold Cup tournaments. On 22 July 2015, Mattocks scored the opening goal in the 2–1 semi-final victory over the United States in Atlanta, Georgia, as the Reggae Boyz qualified for their first ever Gold Cup final. He also scored in the 3–1 defeat to Mexico in the final in Philadelphia.

Personal life
Mattocks received his U.S. green card in May 2014, which qualifies him as a domestic player for MLS roster purposes.

Career statistics

Club

International goals
 Score and result list Jamaica's goal tally first.

References

External links

 
 
 Akron Zips bio
 

1990 births
Living people
People from Saint Catherine Parish
Jamaican footballers
Jamaican expatriate footballers
Jamaica international footballers
Association football forwards
Akron Zips men's soccer players
Vancouver Whitecaps FC players
Portland Timbers players
D.C. United players
Expatriate soccer players in Canada
Major League Soccer players
FC Cincinnati players
Vancouver Whitecaps FC draft picks
Jamaican expatriate sportspeople in Canada
2014 Caribbean Cup players
2015 Copa América players
2015 CONCACAF Gold Cup players
2017 CONCACAF Gold Cup players
2019 CONCACAF Gold Cup players
Al-Merrikh SC players
Sudan Premier League players
Phoenix Rising FC players
USL Championship players
Jamaican expatriate sportspeople in the United States
Expatriate footballers in Sudan
Expatriate soccer players in the United States